Michael F. O'Connell (1877, Tipperary, Ireland - was a politician and first elected at the age of 61 to the Wisconsin State Assembly. He was repeatedly re-elected until 1958, when he was defeated in the Democratic primary race. He had immigrated from Ireland and settled in Milwaukee, Wisconsin.

Biography
O'Connell was born on January 27, 1877, in Tipperary, Ireland. He later immigrated to the United States, settling in Milwaukee, Wisconsin, and working as a railroad conductor.

Career
O'Connell had joined the Democratic Party and became increasingly active after World War II. He was elected to the state Assembly in 1948. He was repeatedly re-elected. But in 1958, O'Connell was defeated in the Democratic primary for his seat by Patrick H. Kelly. He ran unsuccessfully as an Independent in the general election.

References

19th-century Irish people
20th-century Irish people
People from Tipperary (town)
Irish emigrants to the United States (before 1923)
Politicians from Milwaukee
Democratic Party members of the Wisconsin State Assembly
Wisconsin Independents
1877 births
Year of death missing
Conductor (rail)